The African Southern Region Half Marathon Championships is an annual international long-distance road running competition over the half marathon distance (21.1 km) between Southern African nations, organised by the Confederation of African Athletics (CAA). It was established in 2000, and is one of three regional half marathon championships organised by the CAA, alongside the North and East African Half Marathon Championships. 

The competition is one of three senior athletics championships organised for the Southern region, alongside the main African Southern Region Athletics Championships and the African Southern Region Cross Country Championships (both held in odd-numbered years)

A Southern African Marathon Championship was contested in 1989.

Editions 

The 2005 edition was held on a short course.

Champions

References

Confederation of African Athletics competitions
Sport in Southern Africa
Recurring sporting events established in 2000
Annual sporting events
Half marathons